The AWA Southern Tag Team Championship was a professional wrestling tag team title in the Tennessee area from the 1940s through the late 1980s. It was originally named the NWA Southern Tag Team Championship (Mid-America version) from its inception through 1977, when it was renamed (as was the Southern Heavyweight Championship, also previously an NWA title) the AWA Southern Tag Team Championship due to a partnership with the American Wrestling Association. The title existed until 1988 when it was replaced with the Continental Wrestling Association Tag Team Championship.

The title was also referred to as the Mid-Southern Tag Team Championship to avoid confusion with the various other versions of the NWA Southern Tag Team Championship in Championship Wrestling from Florida (1960–1970), Georgia Championship Wrestling (1951–1968), Gulf Coast Championship Wrestling (1955–1966), Mid-Atlantic Championship Wrestling (1953–1969), and Southern Championship Wrestling (1981–1982).

Reigns

 || ref=

Team reigns by combined length
Key

Individual reigns by combined length
Key

Footnotes

See also
NWA Southern Heavyweight Championship (Florida version) – the version of the title used in Championship Wrestling from Florida
NWA Southern Tag Team Championship – the NWA board-controlled version of the title

References

External links
NWA/AWA Southern Tag Team Championship history – Wrestling-Titles.com
1983, 1984
1985, 1986
1987 Mid-South Coliseum event results – ProWrestlingHistory.com

American Wrestling Association championships
Continental Wrestling Association championships
NWA Mid-America championships
Tag team wrestling championships
Regional professional wrestling championships